Schwarze Pumpe may refer to:

 a district of the city of Spremberg in Brandenburg, Germany
 the Schwarze Pumpe power station located there